Verticordia wonganensis is a flowering plant in the myrtle family, Myrtaceae and is endemic to the south-west of Western Australia. It is a shrub which grows near Wongan Hills and has a single main stem, small leaves and spike-like groups of large, pink, feathery flowers.

Description

Flowering time is from November to December.

Taxonomy and naming
Verticordia wonganensis was first formally described by Alex George in 1991 from a specimen collected near Wongan Hills and the description was published in Nuytsia. The specific epithet (wonganensis) is derived from the name of the town, near which the species is found.

George placed this species in subgenus Eperephes, section Verticordella along with V. minutiflora and V. fastigiata.

Distribution and habitat
This verticordia grows in sand in heath and shrubland. It only occurs near Wongan Hills in the Avon Wheatbelt and Geraldton Sandplains biogeographic regions.

Conservation
Verticordia wonganensis is classified as "Priority Two" by the Western Australian Government Department of Parks and Wildlife, meaning that it is poorly known and known from only one or a few locations.

Use in horticulture
Verticordia wonganensis is usually propagated from cuttings but these are difficult to strike and those that do are difficult to establish in gardens.

References

wonganensis
Endemic flora of Western Australia
Myrtales of Australia
Rosids of Western Australia
Plants described in 1991